Ioannis Kossos (1822–1875) was a Greek sculptor of the 19th century. Born in Tripoli, he later studied in Athens and Florence. His work includes several statues and busts in Athens, Patras and other Greek cities.

Kossos died in Athens.

Gallery

References 
 Στέλιος Λυδάκης: "Οι Έλληνες Γλύπτες – Η νεοελληνική γλυπτική: ιστορία – τυπολογία – λεξικό γλυπτών", τόμ. 5ος, σελ. 364 – 365, Εκδοτικός οίκος "ΜΕΛΙΣΣΑ", Αθήνα, 1981. 
 Εγκυκλοπαίδεια Πάπυρος – Λαρούς – Μπριτάνικα, λήμμα "Κόσσος, Ιωάννης" (κείμενο Μ. Στεφανίδης), τόμ.35, σελ. 274, Εκδόσεις Πάπυρος, Αθήνα, 1996. 
 «ΕΛΛΑΣ» (Η ιστορία και ο πολιτισμός του Ελληνικού Έθνους από τις απαρχές μέχρι σήμερα), τόμος 2ος, σελ. 602, Εκδοτικός Οργανισμός «Πάπυρος», Αθήνα, 1998. 
 Ζέττα Αντωνοπούλου: « Τα γλυπτά της Αθήνας: Υπαίθρια Γλυπτική 1834 – 2004», σελ. 25, 28, 30, 34, 38, 132 & 203 – 204, α΄ έκδοση, Εκδόσεις «Ποταμός», Αθήνα, 2003.

External links

1822 births
1875 deaths
Greek sculptors
People from Tripoli, Greece
19th-century sculptors
19th-century Greek sculptors